
Gmina Strachówka is a rural gmina (administrative district) in Wołomin County, Masovian Voivodeship, in east-central Poland.

Villages
Gmina Strachówka contains the villages and settlements of Annopol, Borucza, Grabszczyzna, Jadwisin, Józefów, Kąty Czernickie, Kąty-Miąski, Kąty-Wielgi, Krawcowizna, Księżyki, Marysin, Młynisko, Osęka, Piaski, Równe, Rozalin, Ruda-Czernik, Strachówka, Szamocin, Szlędaki, Wiktoria and Zofinin.

Neighbouring gminas
Gmina Strachówka is bordered by the gminas of Dobre, Jadów, Korytnica, Poświętne, Stanisławów and Tłuszcz.

References
 Polish official population figures 2006

Strachowka
Wołomin County